Eric Rhode (born 10 May 1934) is a British writer on traditional cosmology and psychoanalysis.

Life and work
Rhode's writing is unusual in its striving towards the integration of a wide variety of interests and intellectual disciplines. Coming from a background of many years' work as a critic, author and broadcaster on film and the arts, he undertook a personal psychoanalysis with Donald Meltzer and extended his understanding of psychoanalysis through training as a child psychotherapist at the Tavistock Clinic under Martha Harris. A major concern in his writing is to show how the grammar of psychopathology is a key to major insights of general interest. His later work addresses the interface between the structures discernible in dreams, children's play, aesthetics, ethnographic ritual, and philosophy.

As an undergraduate, Rhode directed plays at the Edinburgh festival; his own early play – The Pagoda Fugue - was aired on BBC Radio. His writing on film appeared in Sight and Sound, The Listener, Encounter, The Observer; he contributed pieces on literature and art to the New Statesman and The Financial Times, while the New Society and The Times Literary Supplement published pieces on psychoanalytic topics, and occasional pieces ran in The Sunday Times. During this period, Rhode wrote Tower of Babel (a collection of writing on the cinema) and also The History of the Cinema from its origins to 1970 for Penguin Books. He edited A game that must be lost, the posthumous papers by Adrian Stokes on psychoanalysis and art, and hosted a 70-minute programme on Adrian Stokes for BBC Radio 3.

After qualifying as a child psychotherapist, Rhode worked in the National Health Service at Paddington Green Child Guidance Clinic and in private practice, and studied with eminent Kleinian psychoanalysts including Wilfred Bion. His first psychoanalytically-informed book was Of Birth and Madness, a London Times Book of the Week. It arose out of interviews he conducted in an inpatient unit for mothers with post-partum psychosis and their babies, but also addressed the historical and cultural evolution of attitudes towards pregnancy and childbirth and the psychiatric theories they inspired. His later books continue to be psychoanalytically informed but extend into aspects of traditional cosmology. Married to the child psychotherapist Maria Rhode. Four children. He lives in London.

Bibliography
Eric Rhode (1967) Tower of Babel. Chilton Books, 1967
Eric Rhode (1976) A History of the Cinema from Its Origins to 1970. Allen Lane. 
Eric Rhode (1987) On Birth & Madness. Gerald Duckworth & Co Ltd. 
Eric Rhode (1990) The Generations of Adam.'. Free Association Books. 
Eric Rhode (1994) Psychotic Metaphysics. Karnac Books. 
Eric Rhode (1998) On Hallucination, Intuition, and the Becoming of "O". Esf. 
Eric Rhode (2003) Plato's Silence. Apex One. 
Eric Rhode (2003) Notes on the Aniconic. Apex One. 
Eric Rhode (2008) Axis Mundi. Apex One. 
Eric Rhode (2015) On Revelation''. Apex One.

External links
 Eric Rhode, Eric's web page. NOW DEFUNCT.

1934 births
Living people
BBC people
British film critics
English film critics
British psychoanalysts
Analysands of Donald Meltzer